Walk Like a Nubian is a studio album released by Nubian singer and bandleader Ali Hassan Kuban. The album is produced by Sabah Habas Mustapha and recorded 1991 at Lunapark Studio in Berlin, Germany, and post-produced and remastered at Audio Studio in Berlin, Germany by Florian Hetze.

Personnel 
Mohammad Laziz Fathi - Bongos, tar, tombana, riq and chorus.
Romani Krishna - Electric bass.
Hassan Mahmoud - Darbuka, dohollah, tar and chorus.
Hassan Makky - Keyboards, accordion.
Ahmad "Al Sa'idi" - Alto saxophone.
Abdel Razik Abdallah - Tenor saxophone and chorus.
Nasreldin Shalaly - Tar and chorus.
Ali Hassan Kuban - Tar and vocals.

Track listing

References

1991 albums
Ali Hassan Kuban albums